WXSM (640 AM) is a radio station serving the Tri-Cities, Tennessee vicinity with a sports format as a CBS Sports Radio affiliate. It broadcasts on AM frequency 640 kHz and is under ownership of Cumulus Media. WXSM also broadcasts Tennessee Titans NFL games, plus ETSU Buccaneer and Dobyns-Bennett High School games.

History
This frequency had the call letters WCQR on June 16, 1986, and WJTZ on November 2, 1987. From April 9, 1993 until February 26, 2007, the 640 frequency was home to classic country WGOC.

References

External links
640 WXSM official website

XSM
Cumulus Media radio stations
CBS Sports Radio stations
Sports radio stations in the United States